Rastovo is a rural locality (a village) in Posyolok Velikodvorsky, Gus-Khrustalny District, Vladimir Oblast, Russia. The population was 2 as of 2010.

Geography 
Rastovo is located on the Ninur River, 49 km south of Gus-Khrustalny (the district's administrative centre) by road. Zalesye is the nearest rural locality.

References 

Rural localities in Gus-Khrustalny District